Pagastiella is a genus of European non-biting midges in the subfamily Chironominae of the bloodworm family Chironomidae.

Species
P. orophila (Edwards, 1929)
P. ostansa (Webb, 1969)

References

Chironomidae
Diptera of Europe